Gazi is a Western suburb of Heraklion and a former municipality in the Heraklion regional unit of Crete in Greece. Since the 2011 local government reform, it has been part of the municipality Malevizi, of which it is a municipal unit.

Villages of Gazi municipal unit, by community:

Gazi (17.7 km²): Gazi, Agia Marina, Agios Dimitrios, Agios Panteleimon, Ammoudara, Council-Houses, Kavrochori, Kefalogiannis, Koluvas, 62 Martyres, Xiropotamos, Kalessa.
Rodia (21.6 km²): Rodia, Kapetanaki Metochi, Linoperamata, Pantanassa, Palaiokastro, Savatiana Monastery.
Fodele (24.4 km²): Fodele, Agios Panteleimon Monastery, Fodele beach.

Achlada (21.6 km²): Achlada, Agia Pelagia, Lygaria, Made.
Kalesia (10.5 km²): Ano Kalesia and Kato Kalesia

Fodele is claimed as the birthplace of the painter El Greco, but this is disputed. His family were from the area and there is a Museum of El Greco in the village.

The ruins of a Genoese castle are at Palaiokastro ("Old Castle").

Agia Pelagia is a seaside resort village.

References

External links
 Official home page 

Populated places in Heraklion (regional unit)